Please Excuse Me for Being Antisocial is the debut studio album by American rapper Roddy Ricch. It was released on December 6, 2019, through Atlantic Records and Bird Vision Entertainment. It features guest appearances from Gunna, Lil Durk, Meek Mill, Mustard, Ty Dolla Sign, and A Boogie wit da Hoodie. The production on the album was handled by multiple producers, including 30 Roc, ATL Jacob, JetsonMade, OZ and Mustard. The album won Album of the Year at the 2020 BET Awards. Apple Music also named it Album of the Year, where it was 2020's most streamed album globally.

Please Excuse Me for Being Antisocial was supported by four singles: "Big Stepper", "Start wit Me" featuring Gunna, "Tip Toe" featuring A Boogie wit da Hoodie, and "High Fashion", featuring Mustard, all of which have been certified platinum or higher. Prior to being released as a single, "The Box" became Roddy Ricch's highest-charting song of his career, reaching number one on the US Billboard Hot 100; the song later became the album's fourth single. The album also received generally positive reviews from music critics and was a massive commercial success. It debuted at number one on the US Billboard 200 chart, earning 101,000 album-equivalent units in its first week. It also spent four non-consecutive weeks atop the chart, becoming the longest-running number one debut rap album since 2003.

Background and production
In an interview with Revolt, the album's audio engineer Chris Dennis uncovered some of the album's recording sessions. Dennis recalls first meeting Roddy Ricch at a studio session one a day in March 2019, where after they "just kept working ever since then" from that day on. Ricch had just returned to the US after touring with Post Malone on the European leg of Malone's Beerbongs & Bentleys Tour. Ricch's label wanted to start working on his debut album, something which Ricch also expressed interest in. Dennis says they spent a "solid year" working on the album, changing tracklists constantly and recording new music. He used production software Plugin Alliance which, he explained, "has no latency in the recording on any of the plugins". For the album, Ricch didn't want to employ a lot of effects or reverb, because "he likes his stuff really clean, dry, and in your face. That was the learning curve in the beginning — getting his clean vocals. You also have to work fast because he can record a song in 10 minutes", Dennis stated. "The Box", for instance, was recorded in roughly 15 minutes. On the track "War Baby", a choir was used, an idea Ricch came up with. The choir was arranged through Ricch's cousin.

Around 250 songs were recorded for the album. Dennis stated that a lot of those songs will instead appear on other artists' albums.

Awards and nominations

Commercial performance
Please Excuse Me for Being Antisocial debuted at number one on the US Billboard 200 with 101,000 album-equivalent units (including 3,000 copies as pure album sales) in its first week. This became Roddy Ricch's first number one on the chart. The album also accumulated a total of 130.7 million in on-demand audio streams for the set's songs. In its second week, the album dropped to number three on the chart, with an additional 81,000 units. In its third week, the album remained at number three on the chart, earning 73,000 more units. In its fourth week, the album climbed to number two on the chart with 74,000 units. In its fifth week, it regained the number one position on the chart, earning 97,000 album-equivalent units, with a 31% increase in total units. The album ended up spending two more weeks at number one in its eighth and tenth week. It became the longest-running number one debut rap album in the US since 2003. On November 5, 2020, the album was certified double platinum by the Recording Industry Association of America (RIAA) for combined sales and album-equivalent units of over two million units in the United States.

Five songs off the album also managed to chart on the US Billboard Hot 100, with "The Box" being the highest-charting song, spending eleven weeks at number one on the chart despite no initial single release. Tracks from the album have sold over 20 million certified units as of January 2022.

Track listing
Credits adapted from Tidal.

Notes
  signifies a co-producer
  signifies an additional producer

Personnel
Credits adapted from Tidal:

 Chris Dennis – recording 
 Curtis "Sircut" Bye – engineering assistant , mixing 
 Zachary Acosta – engineering assistant 
 Cyrus "NOIS" Taghipour – mixing 
 Derek "MixedByAli" Ali – mixing 
 Nicolas de Porcel – mastering 
 Mike Bozzi – mastering

Charts

Weekly charts

Year-end charts

Certifications

References

2019 debut albums
Atlantic Records albums
Roddy Ricch albums